Raffaele is an Italian given name and surname, variant of the English Raphael. Notable people with the name include:

Given name
Raffaele Amato, Italian mobster
Raffaele Cutolo,  Italian mobster
Raffaele Ganci, Italian mobster
Raffaele Cantone, Italian magistrate
Raffaele De Rosa, Italian motorcycle racer
Raffaele Di Paco, Italian cyclist
Raffaele Fitto, Italian politician
Raffaele Guariglia, Italian politician
Raffaele Lombardo, Italian politician
Raffaele Palladino, Italian footballer
Raffaele Pinto, Italian racing driver
Raffaele Pisu, Italiano actor
Raffaele Riario, Italian cardinal
Raffaele Rossetti, Italian politician
Raffaele Carlo Rossi, Italian cardinal
Raffaele Viviani, Italian artist
Raffaele Contigiani (1920–2008), Italian architect

Surname
 Virginia Raffaele, Italian actress

See also 

 Raphael (disambiguation)
 Rafael (disambiguation)
 San Raffaele (disambiguation)
 Raffaello (disambiguation)

Italian-language surnames
Italian masculine given names